.xk is a temporary, unofficial country code top-level domain for Kosovo, assigned under UN Security Council resolution 1244/99.

XK falls under the ISO 3166-1 "alpha-2 user-assigned codes", which include AA, ZZ, QM to QZ and XA to XZ. This means it is reserved for private use and will not be permanently assigned to any entity – nor used as a country code top-level domain. Thus, its use is unofficial and temporary, until Kosovo is assigned its own alpha-2 country code, with possible options including .ka, .ks, .kv, and .ko (although the latter might not end up chosen due to a possible use for a reunified Korea, if South Korea's current domain, .kr, is superseded).

Notes

See also 
 XK (user assigned code)
 ISO 3166-1 alpha-2
 Proposed top-level domain

References 

Top-level domains
Communications in Kosovo